Vera Pauw (born 18 January 1963) is a Dutch football coach and former player. She currently manages the Republic of Ireland women's national football team. She has managed several national women's football teams, including Scotland, Netherlands, Russia and South Africa.

Playing career
As a child, Pauw played football with her two brothers on the streets. When she was 13 years old SV Bredorodes started a women's team which Pauw joined, and at the age of 18 she moved to VSV Vreeswijk to play at a higher level. Soon she arrived at the Netherlands women's national football team and from 1983 to 1998 played 89 international matches, but never qualified for the final tournament of a World Cup or European Championship. She did become the first female Dutch player to play professionally outside the country, when she signed for Italian Serie A club Modena in 1988. After two years in Italy, she returned to the Netherlands and played for Puck Deventer and SV Saestum.

International goals
Scores and results list the Netherlands goal tally first.

Coaching career
In September 1998, Pauw was appointed coach and technical director of Scotland, at the same time her husband Bert van Lingen was working as assistant manager of Glasgow Rangers. She departed in October 2004 to take up a similar role with the Netherlands and led her home country to the semi-final of UEFA Women's Euro 2009. She was controversially fired in the first half of 2010.

In April 2011, she succeeded Igor Shalimov as coach of the Russia on an interim basis. In September 2011 she was replaced by Farid Benstiti. After that she was appointed as a technical director of Russian team.

In March 2014, she became the South Africa coach, replacing Joseph Mkhonza who became a selector for the national team. She said at the time "I am excited to become part of this ambitious project in which we can develop our girls into international stars. SAFA is aiming high with women’s football." Pauw explained that she had previously had a great deal of involvement with the South Africa setup due to the frequency of friendlies with the Dutch while she was managing them.

She resigned as South Africa head coach after leading the nation to the 2016 Olympics. On 27 November 2017 Pauw was hired as the new head coach of the Houston Dash. On 20 September 2018 Pauw departed from the National Women's Soccer League club,  after having abused players. 

On 4 September 2019, Pauw was appointed as the new manager of the Ireland team. Despite Ireland's narrow failure to achieve a play-off position from UEFA Women's Euro 2022 qualifying Group I, Pauw agreed a two-year contract extension in February 2021. She then made up a historic milestone after the narrow missing of the Women's Euro 2022, guiding the Irish team to the first-ever major tournament, the 2023 FIFA Women's World Cup, with an emotional 1–0 playoff win over Scotland.

Personal life 
Pauw is married to her former national team coach Bert van Lingen.

Rape allegations
In July 2022, Pauw accused an unnamed Dutch FA director and later football manager of sexually abusing her during her playing career. Former coach Piet Buter then declared he assumed he was the subject of her accusation and denied all allegations except for having an affair with her at the time. The KNVB (Dutch football association) stated that it had made errors handling Pauw's complaints and was sorry that she had not had a safe working environment.

Misconduct scandal

In December 2022, Pauw was named in a report by the US National Women's Soccer League that discovered widespread ongoing misconduct in the National Women's Soccer League. The report claimed that during her time in charge of Houston Dash, Pauw attempted to exert excessive control over her players eating habits. Pauw denied any wrongdoing. Pauw is banned from working in the NWSL unless she accepts personal responsibility.

References 

1963 births
Living people
Footballers from Amsterdam
Dutch women's footballers
Netherlands women's international footballers
Dutch expatriate sportspeople in Ireland
Dutch expatriate sportspeople in Italy
Serie A (women's football) players
Expatriate women's footballers in Italy
Dutch football managers
Female association football managers
Dutch expatriate football managers
Expatriate football managers in Scotland
Expatriate football managers in Russia
Expatriate soccer managers in South Africa
Expatriate soccer managers in the United States
Scotland women's national football team managers
Netherlands women's national football team managers
Russia women's national football team managers
South Africa women's national soccer team managers
National Women's Soccer League coaches
Houston Dash coaches
Olympic coaches
Women's association football defenders
Expatriate football managers in the Republic of Ireland
Republic of Ireland women's national football team managers
Dutch expatriate women's footballers
Puck Deventer players
SV Saestum players
C.F. Euromobil Modena players
Dutch expatriate sportspeople in the United States
Dutch expatriate sportspeople in Scotland
Dutch expatriate sportspeople in South Africa
Dutch expatriate sportspeople in Russia